Great Train eXpress is a planned higher-speed commuter rail network in the Seoul Capital Area project consisting of three separate lines, named GTX A, GTX B and GTX C, and scheduled for completion in 2025.

GTX A 
Groundbreaking for GTX Line A was held on December 27, 2018, with service expected to commence in 2023. However, the project has been officially delayed due to land compensation issues and the discovery of archeological ruins dating from the Joseon period. The Suseo-Dongtan section is now scheduled to be completed in 2023 and the rest of the line to open in 2024. Samseong Station being even further delayed and will remain closed after the rest of GTX A opens until 2028. As of October 2021, the project was only about 20% complete, leading to speculation that GTX A is more likely to be completed around 2024 or 2025 or even later. Approximately 30 kilometers of the line are expected to share the same rail as the SRT, and a further 9 km towards the western end of the route are expected to be completely underground.

GTX B 
Construction of GTX Line B is expected to start in 2023.

GTX C 
Construction of GTX Line C is expected to start in 2022. According to the latest plans and following the selection of a preferred bidder for the construction of this line, 2 additional stations,  Indeogwon Station and Wangsimni Station are likely to be added to the line.

Additional plans for GTX D and other lines 
Plans for a Line D were announced in 2021 by the previous government. However, the proposed route faced a lot of opposition, and has not been approved yet. The new government of Yoon Seok-youl has pledged to build 3 new lines (Line D, E and F), for which the routes have not been decided yet, but which would likely include plans for a longer Line D than the one announced by the previous government.

Criticism 
Critics argue that GTX project would increase the social and economic centripetal force towards Seoul leading to increased primacy and the collapse of other provincial cities.

Notes

References

Higher-speed rail
Rapid transit in South Korea
Rail transport in Seoul
Proposed railway lines in Asia
Proposed public transport in South Korea
Underground commuter rail
Proposed transport infrastructure in South Korea